Małgorzata Urszula Rydz-Kapkowska (born January 18, 1967 in Kłobuck, Śląskie) is a former female middle distance runner from Poland, who represented her native country at two consecutive Summer Olympics, starting in Barcelona, Spain (1992). She set her personal best (4:01.91) in the women's 1,500 metres event in 1992.

International competitions

References

 

1967 births
Living people
People from Kłobuck County
Polish female middle-distance runners
Athletes (track and field) at the 1992 Summer Olympics
Athletes (track and field) at the 1996 Summer Olympics
Olympic athletes of Poland
Sportspeople from Silesian Voivodeship
World Athletics Championships athletes for Poland
20th-century Polish women
21st-century Polish women